The Catholic Church in St. Lucia is part of the worldwide Catholic Church, under the spiritual leadership of the Pope and the curia in Rome. Catholics form roughly a two-thirds majority (61.5%) of the island's population of 163,362 (2004). The entire country comprises a single diocese, the Archdiocese of Castries.

Saint Lucia is a member of the Antilles Episcopal Conference and shares a single apostolic nuncio with the other nations that are part of the episcopal conference.

References

 
Saint Lucia